Punjab Province was a provincial colony of the British Raj, with its capital in the city of Lahore. Most of the Punjab region was annexed by the British EIC in April 1849 following the Second Anglo-Sikh War, and declared a province of British Colonial Rule, it was one of the last areas of the Indian subcontinent to fall under British control. In 1858, the Punjab, along with the rest of the Subcontinent, came under the direct rule of the British Crown. It had an area of 358,354.5 km2.

The province comprised four natural geographic regions – Indo-Gangetic Plain West, Himalayan, Sub-Himalayan, and the North-West Dry Area – along with five administrative divisions – Delhi, Jullundur, Lahore, Multan, and Rawalpindi – and a number of princely states. In 1947, the Partition of India led to the province's division into East Punjab and West Punjab, in the newly independent dominions of India and Pakistan respectively.

Etymology
The region was originally called Sapta Sindhu, the Vedic land of the seven rivers flowing into the ocean. The Sanskrit name for the region, as mentioned in the Ramayana and Mahabharata for example, was Panchanada which means "Land of the Five Rivers", and was translated to Persian as Punjab after the Muslim conquests. The later name Punjab is a compound of two Persian words Panj (five) and āb (water) and was introduced to the region by the Turko-Persian conquerors of India and more formally popularised during the Mughal Empire. Punjab literally means "(The Land of) Five Waters" referring to the rivers: Jhelum, Chenab, Ravi, Sutlej, and Beas. All are tributaries of the Indus River, the Chenab being the largest.

Geography
Geographically, the province was a triangular tract of country of which the Indus River and its tributary the Sutlej formed the two sides up to their confluence, the base of the triangle in the north being the Lower Himalayan Range between those two rivers. Moreover, the province as constituted under British rule also included a large tract outside these boundaries. Along the northern border, Himalayan ranges divided it from Kashmir and Tibet. On the west it was separated from the North-West Frontier Province by the Indus, until it reached the border of Dera Ghazi Khan District, which was divided from Baluchistan by the Sulaiman Range. To the south lay Sindh and Rajputana, while on the east the rivers Jumna and Tons separated it from the United Provinces. In total Punjab had an area of approximately 357 000 km square about the same size as modern day Germany, being one of the largest provinces of the British Raj.

It encompassed the present day Indian states of Punjab, Haryana, Chandigarh, Delhi, and some parts of Himachal Pradesh which were merged with Punjab by the British for administrative purposes (but excluding the former princely states which were later combined into the Patiala and East Punjab States Union) and the Pakistani regions of the Punjab, Islamabad Capital Territory and Khyber Pakhtunkhwa.

In 1901 the frontier districts beyond the Indus were separated from Punjab and made into a new province: the North-West Frontier Province. Subsequently, Punjab was divided into four natural geographical divisions by colonial officials on the decadal census data:
 Indo-Gangetic Plain West geographical division (including Hisar district, Loharu State, Rohtak district, Dujana State, Gurgaon district, Pataudi State, Delhi, Karnal district, Jalandhar district, Kapurthala State, Ludhiana district, Malerkotla State, Firozpur district, Faridkot State, Patiala State, Jind State, Nabha State, Lahore District, Amritsar district, Gujranwala District, and Sheikhupura District);
 Himalayan geographical division (including Sirmoor State, Simla District, Simla Hill States, Bilaspur State, Kangra district, Mandi State, Suket State, and Chamba State);
 Sub-Himalayan geographical division (including Ambala district, Kalsia State, Hoshiarpur district, Gurdaspur district, Sialkot District, Gujrat District, Jhelum District, Rawalpindi District, and Attock District;
 North-West Dry Area geographical division (including Montgomery District, Shahpur District, Mianwali District, Lyallpur District, Jhang District, Multan District, Bahawalpur State, Muzaffargarh District, Dera Ghazi Khan District, and the Biloch Trans–Frontier Tract).

History

Company rule

On 21February 1849, the East India Company decisively defeated the Sikh Empire at the Battle of Gujrat bringing to an end the Second Anglo-Sikh War. Following the victory, the East India Company annexed the Punjab on 2April 1849 and incorporated it within British India. The province whilst nominally under the control of the Bengal Presidency was administratively independent. Lord Dalhousie constituted the Board of Administration by inducting into it the most experienced and seasoned British officers. The Board was led by Sir Henry Lawrence, who had previously worked as British Resident at the Lahore Durbar and also consisted of his younger brother John Lawrence and Charles Grenville Mansel. Below the Board, a group of acclaimed officers collectively known as Henry Lawrence's "Young Men" assisted in the administration of the newly acquired province.  The Board was abolished by Lord Dalhousie in 1853; Sir Henry was assigned to the Rajputana Agency, and his brother John succeeded as the first Chief Commissioner.

Recognising the cultural diversity of the Punjab, the Board maintained a strict policy of non-interference in regard to religious and cultural matters. Sikh aristocrats were given patronage and pensions and groups in control of historical places of worship were allowed to remain in control.

During the Indian Rebellion of 1857, the Punjab remained relatively peaceful, apart from rebellion led by Ahmad Khan Kharral. In May, John Lawrence took swift action to disarm potentially mutinous sepoys and redeploy most European troops to the Delhi ridge. Finally he recruited new regiments of Punjabis to replace the depleted force, and was provided with manpower and support from surrounding princely states such as Jind, Patiala, Nabha and Kapurthala and tribal chiefs on the borderlands with Afghanistan. By 1858, an estimated 70,000 extra men had been recruited for the army and militarised police from within the Punjab.

British Raj

In 1858, under the terms of the Queen's Proclamation issued by Queen Victoria, the Punjab, along with the rest of British India, came under the direct rule of the British Crown. Delhi Territory was transferred from the North-Western Provinces to the Punjab in 1858, partly to punish the city for the important role the last Mughal emperor, Bahadur Shah II, and the city as a whole, played in the 1857 Rebellion.

Sir John Lawrence, then Chief Commissioner, was appointed the first Lieutenant-Governor on 1January 1859. In 1866, the Judicial Commissioner was replaced by a Chief Court. The direct administrative functions of the Government were carried by the Lieutenant-Governor through the Secretariat, comprising a Chief Secretary, a Secretary and two Under-Secretaries. They were usually members of the Indian Civil Service. The territory under the Lieutenant consisted of 29 Districts, grouped under 5 Divisions, and 43 Princely States. Each District was under a Deputy-Commissioner, who reported to the Commissioner of the Division. Each District was subdivided into between three and seven tehsils, each under a tahsildar, assisted by a naib (deputy) tahsildar.

In 1885 the Punjab administration began an ambitious plan to transform over six million acres of barren waste land in central and western Punjab into irrigable agricultural land. The creation of canal colonies was designed to relieve demographic pressures in the central parts of the province, increase productivity and revenues, and create a loyal support amongst peasant landholders. The colonisation resulted in an agricultural revolution in the province, rapid industrial growth, and the resettlement of over one million Punjabis in the new areas. A number of towns were created or saw significant development in the colonies, such as Lyallpur, Sargodha and Montgomery. Colonisation led to the canal irrigated area of the Punjab increasing from three to fourteen million acres in the period from 1885 to 1947.

The beginning of the twentieth century saw increasing unrest in the Punjab. Conditions in the Chenab colony, together with land reforms such as the Punjab Land Alienation Act, 1900 and the Colonisation Bill, 1906 contributed to the 1907 Punjab unrest. The unrest was unlike any previous agitation in the province as the government had for the first time aggrieved a large portion of the rural population. Mass demonstrations were organised, headed by Lala Lajpat Rai, a leader of the Hindu revivalist sect Arya Samaj. The unrest resulted in the repeal of the Colonisation Bill and the end of paternalist policies in the colonies.

During the First World War, Punjabi manpower contributed heavily to the Indian Army. Out of a total of 683,149 combat troops, 349,688 hailed from the province. In 1918, an influenza epidemic broke out in the province, resulting in the deaths of an estimated 962,937 people or 4.77 percent of the total estimated population. In March 1919 the Rowlatt Act was passed extending emergency measures of detention and incarceration in response to the perceived threat of terrorism from revolutionary nationalist organisations. This led to the infamous Jallianwala Bagh massacre in April 1919, where Colonel Reginald Edward Harry Dyer ordered detachments of the 9th Gorkha Rifles and the 59th Scinde Rifles under his command to fire into a group of some 10,000 unarmed protesters and Baisakhi pilgrims, killing 379.

Administrative reforms
The Montagu–Chelmsford Reforms enacted through the Government of India Act 1919 expanded the Punjab Legislative Council and introduced the principle of dyarchy, whereby certain responsibilities such as agriculture, health, education, and local government, were transferred to elected ministers. The first Punjab Legislative Council under the 1919 Act was constituted in 1921, comprising 93 members, seventy per cent to be elected and rest to be nominated. Some of the British Indian ministers under the dyarchy scheme were Sir Sheikh Abdul Qadir, Sir Shahab-ud-Din Virk and Lala Hari Kishen Lal.

The Government of India Act 1935 introduced provincial autonomy to Punjab replacing the system of dyarchy. It provided for the constitution of Punjab Legislative Assembly of 175 members presided by a Speaker and an executive government responsible to the Assembly. The Unionist Party under Sir Sikandar Hayat Khan formed the government in 1937. Sir Sikandar was succeeded by Malik Khizar Hayat Tiwana in 1942 who remained the Premier till partition in 1947. Although the term of the Assembly was five years, the Assembly continued for about eight years and its last sitting was held on 19 March 1945.

Partition

The struggle for Indian independence witnessed competing and conflicting interests in the Punjab. The landed elites of the Muslim, Hindu and Sikh communities had loyally collaborated with the British since annexation, supported the Unionist Party and were hostile to the Congress party led independence movement. Amongst the peasantry and urban middle classes, the Hindus were the most active National Congress supporters, the Sikhs flocked to the Akali movement whilst the Muslims eventually supported the Muslim League.

Since the partition of the sub-continent had been decided, special meetings of the Western and Eastern Section of the Legislative Assembly were held on 23 June 1947 to decide whether or not the Province of the Punjab be partitioned. After voting on both sides, partition was decided and the existing Punjab Legislative Assembly was also divided into West Punjab Legislative Assembly and the East Punjab Legislative Assembly. This last Assembly before independence, held its last sitting on 4 July 1947.

Demographics

The first British census of the Punjab was carried out in 1855. This covered only British territory to the exclusion of local princely states, and placed the population at 17.6 million. The first regular census of British India carried out in 1881 recorded a population of 20.8 million people. The final British census in 1941 recorded 34.3 million people in the Punjab, which comprised 29 districts within British territory, 43 princely states, 52,047 villages and 283 towns.

In 1881, only Amritsar and Lahore had populations over 100,000.  The commercial and industrial city of Amritsar (152,000) was slightly larger than the cultural capital of Lahore (149,000). Over the following sixty years, Lahore increased in population fourfold, whilst Amritsar grew two-fold. By 1941, the province had seven cities with populations over 100,000 with emergence and growth of Rawalpindi, Multan, Sialkot, Jullundur and Ludhiana.

The colonial period saw large scale migration within the Punjab due to the creation of canal colonies in western Punjab. The majority of colonists hailed from the seven most densely populated districts of Amritsar, Gurdaspur, Jullundur, Hoshiarpur, Ludhiana, Ambala and Sialkot, and consisted primarily of Khatris, Jats, Arains, Sainis, Kambohs and Rajputs. The movement of many highly skilled farmers from eastern and central Punjab to the new colonies, led to western Punjab becoming the most progressive and advanced agricultural region of the province. The period also saw significant numbers of Punjabis emigrate to other regions of the British Empire. The main destinations were East Africa - Kenya, Uganda and Tanzania, Southeast Asia - Malaya and Burma, Hong Kong and Canada.

Religion

The Punjab was a religiously eclectic province, comprising three major groups: Muslims, Hindus and Sikhs.  By 1941, the religious Muslims constituting an absolute majority at 53.2%, whilst the Hindu population was at 30.1%. The period between 1881 and 1941 saw a significant increase in the Sikh and Christian populations, growing from 8.2% and 0.1% to 14.9% and 1.9% respectively.  The decrease in the Hindu population has been attributed to the conversion of Hindus mainly to Sikhism and Islam, and also to Christianity.

Territory comprises the contemporary subdivisions of Punjab, Pakistan and Islamabad Capital Territory.

Territory comprises the contemporary subdivisions of Punjab, India, Chandigarh, Haryana, and Himachal Pradesh.

Indo−Gangetic Plain West geographical division 
Including Hisar district, Loharu State, Rohtak district, Dujana State, Gurgaon district, Pataudi State, Delhi, Karnal district, Jalandhar district, Kapurthala State, Ludhiana district, Malerkotla State, Firozpur district, Faridkot State, Patiala State, Jind State, Nabha State, Lahore District, Amritsar district, Gujranwala District, and Sheikhupura District.

Himalayan geographical division 
Including Sirmoor State, Simla District, Simla Hill States, Bilaspur State, Kangra district, Mandi State, Suket State, and Chamba State.

Sub−Himalayan geographical division 
Including Ambala district, Kalsia State, Hoshiarpur district, Gurdaspur district, Sialkot District, Gujrat District, Jhelum District, Rawalpindi District, and Attock District.

North−West Dry Area geographical division 
Including Montgomery District, Shahpur District, Mianwali District, Lyallpur District, Jhang District, Multan District, Bahawalpur State, Muzaffargarh District, Dera Ghazi Khan District, and the Biloch Trans–Frontier Tract.

Language 
As with religion, Punjab was a linguistically eclectically diverse province and region. In 1837, Persian had been abolished as the official language of Company administration and replaced by local Indian vernacular languages. In the Sikh Empire, Persian continued to be the official state language. Shortly after annexing the Punjab in 1849, the Board of Administration canvassed local officials in each of the provinces's six divisions to decide which language was "best suited for the Courts and Public Business". Officials in the western divisions recommended Persian whilst eastern officials suggested a shift to Urdu. In September 1849 a two-language policy was instituted throughout the province. The language policy in the Punjab differed from other Indian provinces in that Urdu was not a widespread local vernacular. In 1849 John Lawrence noted "that Urdu is not the language of these districts and neither is Persian".

In 1854, the Board of Administration abruptly ended the two-language policy and Urdu was designated as the official language of government across the province. The decision was motivated by new civil service rules requiring all officials pass a test in the official language of their local court. In fear of potentially losing their jobs, officials in Persian districts petitioned the board to replace Persian with Urdu, believing Urdu the easier language to master. Urdu remained the official administrative language until 1947.

Officials, although aware that Punjabi was the colloquial language of the majority, instead favoured the use of Urdu for a number of reasons. Criticism of Punjabi included the belief that it was simply a form of patois, lacking any form of standardisation, and that "would be inflexible and barren, and incapable of expressing nice shades of meaning and exact logical ideas with the precision so essential in local proceedings." Similar arguments had earlier been made about Bengali, Oriya and Hindustani; however, those languages were later adopted for local administration. Instead it is believed the advantages of Urdu served the administration greater. Urdu, and initially Persian, allowed the Company to recruit experienced administrators from elsewhere in India who did not speak Punjabi, to facilitate greater integration with other Indian territories which were administered with Urdu, and to help foster ties with local elites who spoke Persian and Urdu and could act as intermediaries with the wider populace.

As per the 1911 census, speakers of the Punjabi dialects and languages, including standard Punjabi along with Lahnda formed just over three-quarters (75.93 per cent) of the total provincial population.

Indo−Gangetic Plain West geographical division 
Including Hisar district, Loharu State, Rohtak district, Dujana State, Gurgaon district, Pataudi State, Delhi, Karnal district, Jalandhar district, Kapurthala State, Ludhiana district, Malerkotla State, Firozpur district, Faridkot State, Patiala State, Jind State, Nabha State, Lahore District, Amritsar district, and Gujranwala District.

Himalayan geographical division 
Including Nahan State, Simla district, Simla Hill States, Kangra district, Mandi State, Suket State, and Chamba State.

Sub−Himalayan geographical division 
Including Ambala district, Kalsia State, Hoshiarpur district, Gurdaspur district, Sialkot District, Gujrat District, Jhelum District, Rawalpindi District, and Attock District.

North–West Dry Area geographical division 
Including Montgomery District, Shahpur District, Mianwali District, Lyallpur District, Jhang District, Multan District, Bahawalpur State, Muzaffargarh District, and Dera Ghazi Khan District.

Castes and tribes 
Punjab Province was diverse, with many castes, subcastes and tribes all forming parts of the various ethnic groups in the province, contemporarily known as Punjabis, Saraikis, Haryanvis, Hindkowans, Dogras, Paharis, and others.

Literacy

Administrative divisions

Agriculture
Within a few years of its annexation, the Punjab was regarded as British India's model agricultural province. From the 1860s onwards, agricultural prices and land values soared in the Punjab. This stemmed from increasing political security and improvements in infrastructure and communications. New cash crops such as wheat, tobacco, sugar cane and cotton were introduced. By the 1920s the Punjab produced a tenth of India's total cotton crop and a third of its wheat crop. Per capita output of all the crops in the province increased by approximately 45 percent between 1891 and 1921, a growth contrasting to agricultural crises in Bengal, Bihar and Orissa during the period.

The Punjab Agricultural College and Research Institute became the first higher educational agricultural institution in the Punjab when established in 1906. Rapid agricultural growth, combined with access to easy credit for landowners, led to a growing crisis of indebtedness.  When landowners were unable to pay down their loans, urban based moneylenders took advantage of the law to foreclose debts of mortgaged land.  This led to a situation where land increasingly passed to absentee moneylenders who had little connection to the villages were the land was located. The colonial government recognised this as a potential threat to the stability of the province, and a split emerged in the government between paternalists who favoured intervention to ensure order, and those who opposed state intervention in private property relations. The paternalists emerged victorious and the Punjab Land Alienation Act, 1900 prevented urban commercial castes, who were overwhelmingly Hindu, from permanently acquiring land from statutory agriculturalist tribes, who were mainly Muslim and Sikh.

Accompanied by the increasing franchise of the rural population, this interventionist approach led to a long lasting impact on the political landscape of the province. The agricultural lobby remained loyal to the government, and rejected communalism in common defence of its privileges against urban moneylenders. This position was entrenched by the Unionist Party. The Congress Party's opposition to the Act led to it being marginalised in the Punjab, reducing its influence more so than in any other province, and inhibiting its ability to challenge colonial rule locally. The political dominance of the Unionist Party would remain until partition, and significantly it was only on the collapse of its power on the eve of independence from Britain, that communal violence began to spread in rural Punjab.

Army
In the immediate aftermath of annexation, the Sikh Khalsa Army was disbanded, and soldiers were required to surrender their weapons and return to agricultural or other pursuits. The Bengal Army, keen to utilise the highly trained ex-Khalsa army troops began to recruit from the Punjab for Bengal infantry units stationed in the province. However opposition to the recruitment of these soldiers spread and resentment emerged from sepoys of the Bengal Army towards the incursion of Punjabis into their ranks. In 1851, the Punjab Irregular Force also known as the 'Piffars' was raised. Initially they consisted of one garrison and four mule batteries, four regiments of cavalry, eleven of infantry and the Corps of Guides, totalling approximately 13,000 men. The gunners and infantry were mostly Punjabi, many from the Khalsa Army, whilst the cavalry had a considerable Hindustani presence.

During the Indian Rebellion of 1857, eighteen new regiments were raised from the Punjab which remained loyal to the East India Company throughout the crisis in the Punjab and United Provinces. By June 1858, of the 80,000 native troops in the Bengal Army, 75,000 were Punjabi of which 23,000 were Sikh. In the aftermath of the rebellion, a thorough re-organisation of the army took place. Henceforth recruitment into the British Indian Army was restricted to loyal peoples and provinces. Punjabi Sikhs emerged as a particularly favoured martial race to serve the army. In the midst of The Great Game, and fearful of a Russian invasion of British India, the Punjab was regarded of significant strategic importance as a frontier province. In addition to their loyalty and a belief in their suitability to serve in harsh conditions, Punjabi recruits were favoured as they could be paid at the local service rate, whereas soldiers serving on the frontier from more distant lands had to be paid extra foreign service allowances. By 1875, of the entire Indian army, a third of recruits hailed from the Punjab.

In 1914, three fifths of the Indian army came from the Punjab, despite the region constituting approximately one tenth of the total population of British India.  During the First World War, Punjabi Sikhs alone accounted for one quarter of all armed personnel in India. Military service provided access to the wider world, and personnel were deployed across the British Empire from Malaya, the Mediterranean and Africa. Upon completion of their terms of service, these personnel were often amongst the first to seek their fortunes abroad. At the outbreak of the Second World War, 48 percent of the Indian army came from the province. In Jhelum, Rawalpindi and Attock, the percentage of the total male population who enlisted reached fifteen percent. The Punjab continued to be the main supplier of troops throughout the war, contributing 36 percent of the total Indian troops who served in the conflict.

The huge proportion of Punjabis in the army meant that a significant amount of military expenditure went to Punjabis and in turn resulted in an abnormally high level of resource input in the Punjab. It has been suggested that by 1935 if remittances of serving officers were combined with income from military pensions, more than two thirds of Punjab's land revenue could have been paid out of military incomes. Military service further helped reduce the extent of indebtedness across the Province. In Hoshiarpur, a notable source of military personnel, in 1920 thirty percent of proprietors were debt free compared to the region's average of eleven percent. In addition, the benefits of military service and the perception that the government was benevolent towards soldiers, affected the latter's attitudes towards the British. The loyalty of recruited peasantry and the influence of military groups in rural areas across the province limited the reach of the nationalist movement in the province.

Communications and transport
In 1853, the Viceroy Lord Dalhousie issued a minute stressing the military importance of railways across India. In the Punjab, however, it was initially strategic commercial interests which drove investment in railways and communications from 1860.

Independent railway companies emerged, such as the Scinde, Punjab and Delhi railways to build and operate new lines. In 1862, the first section of railway in the Punjab was constructed between Lahore and Amritsar, and Lahore Junction railway station opened. Lines were opened between Lahore and Multan in 1864, and Amritsar and Delhi in 1870.  The Scinde, Punjab and Delhi railways merged to form the Scinde, Punjab & Delhi Railway in 1870, creating a link between Karachi and Lahore via Multan. The Punjab Northern State Railway linked Lahore and Peshawar in 1883. By 1886, the independent railways had amalgamated into North Western State Railway.

The construction of railway lines and the network of railway workshops generated employment opportunities, which in turn led to increased immigration into cantonment towns. As connectivity increased across the province, it facilitated the movement of goods, and increased human interaction. It has been observed that the Ferozpur, Lahore and Amritsar began to develop into one composite cultural triangle due to the ease of connectivity between them. Similarly barriers of spoken dialects eroded over time, and cultural affinities were increasingly fostered.

Education
In 1854, the Punjab education department was instituted with a policy to provide secular education in all government managed institutions. Privately run institutions would only receive grants-in-aid in return for providing secular instruction. By 1864 this had resulted in a situation whereby all grants-in-aid to higher education schools and colleges were received by institutions under European management, and no indigenous owned schools received government help.

In the early 1860s, a number of educational colleges were established, including Lawrence College, Murree, King Edward Medical University, Government College, Lahore,
Glancy Medical College and Forman Christian College. In 1882, Gottlieb Wilhelm Leitner published a damning report on the state of education in the Punjab. He lamented the failure to reconcile government run schools with traditional indigenous schools, and noted a steady decline in the number of schools across the province since annexation. He noted in particular how Punjabi Muslim's avoided government run schools due to the lack of religious subjects taught in them, observing how at least 120,000 Punjabis attended schools unsupported by the state and describing it as 'a protest by the people against our system of education.' Leitner had long advocated the benefits of oriental scholarship, and the fusion of government education with religious instruction. In January 1865 he had established the Anjuman-i-Punjab, a subscription based association aimed at using a European style of learning to promote useful knowledge, whilst also reviving traditional scholarship in Arabic, Persian and Sanskrit. In 1884, a reorganisation of the Punjab education system occurred, introducing measures tending towards decentralisation of control over education and the promotion of an indigenous education agency. As a consequence several new institutions were encouraged in the province. The Arya Samaj opened a college in Lahore in 1886, the Sikhs opened the Khalsa College whilst the Anjuman-i-Himayat-i-Islam stepped in to organise Muslim education. In 1886, the Punjab Chiefs' College, later renamed Aitchison College, was opened to further the education of the elite classes.

Government

Early administration

In 1849, a Board of Administration was put in place to govern the newly annexed province. The Board was led by a President and two assistants. Beneath them Commissioners acted as Superintendents of revenue and police and exercised the civil appellate and the original criminal powers of Sessions Judges, whilst Deputy Commissioners were given subordinate civil, criminal and fiscal powers. In 1853, the Board of Administration was abolished, and authority was invested in a single Chief Commissioner. The Government of India Act 1858 led to further restructuring and the office of Lieutenant-Governor replaced that of Chief Commissioner.

Although The Indian Councils Act, 1861 laid the foundation for the establishment of a local legislature in the Punjab, the first legislature was constituted in 1897. It consisted of a body of nominated officials and non-officials and was presided over by the Lieutenant-Governor. The first council lasted for eleven years until 1909. The Morley-Minto Reforms led to an elected members complementing the nominated officials in subsequent councils.

Punjab Legislative Council and Assembly
The Government of India Act 1919 introduced the system of dyarchy across British India and led to the implementation of the first Punjab Legislative Council in 1921. At the same time the office of lieutenant governor was replaced with that of governor. The initial Council had ninety three members, seventy per cent of which were elected and the rest nominated. A president was elected by the Council to preside over the meetings. Between 1921 and 1936, there were four terms of the Council.

In 1935, the Government of India Act 1935 replaced dyarchy with increased provincial autonomy. It introduced direct elections, and enabled elected Indian representatives to form governments in the provincial assemblies. The Punjab Legislative Council was replaced by a Punjab Legislative Assembly, and the role of President with that of a Speaker. Membership of the Assembly was fixed at 175 members, and it was intended to sit for five years.

First Assembly Election

The first election was held in 1937 and was won outright by the Unionist Party. Its leader, Sir Sikandar Hayat Khan was asked by the Governor, Sir Herbert Emerson to form a Ministry and he chose a cabinet consisting of three Muslims, two Hindus and a Sikh. Sir Sikandar died in 1942 and was succeeded as Premier by Khizar Hayat Khan Tiwana.

Second Assembly Election

The next election was held in 1946. The Muslim League won the most seats, winning 73 out of a total of 175. However a coalition led by the Unionist Party and consisting of the Congress Party and Akali Party were able to secure an overall majority. A campaign of civil disobedience by the Muslim League followed, lasting six weeks, and led to the resignation of Sir Khizar Tiwana and the collapse of the coalition government on 2 March 1947. The Muslim League however were unable to attract the support of other minorities to form a coalition government themselves. Amid this stalemate the Governor Sir Evan Jenkins assumed control of the government and remained in charge until the independence of India and Pakistan.

Coat of arms

Crescat e Fluviis meaning, Let it grow from the rivers was the Latin motto used in the Coat of arms for Punjab Province. As per the book History of the Sikhs written by Khushwant Singh, it means Strength from the Rivers.

See also
 History of Punjab
 British Raj
 List of misls of the Sikh Confederacy
 Punjab (region)
 Sikh Empire

References

Provinces of British India
1849 establishments in British India
1947 disestablishments in British India
History of Punjab